Tan Tjoe Gwat (born 22 July 1938) is an Indonesian weightlifter. He competed in the men's bantamweight event at the 1960 Summer Olympics.

References

External links
 

1938 births
Living people
Indonesian male weightlifters
Olympic weightlifters of Indonesia
Weightlifters at the 1960 Summer Olympics
People from Wonogiri Regency
20th-century Indonesian people